A dzielnica is a subdivision of a Polish town (and historically a subdivision of the Polish kingdom).

Dzielnica may also refer to:

 Dzielnica, Gmina Czerniewice in Łódź Voivodeship (central Poland)
 Dzielnica, Gmina Żelechlinek in Łódź Voivodeship (central Poland)
 Dzielnica, Opole Voivodeship (south-west Poland)